Travis Alexander Mager (born September 9, 1990) is an American ice dancer. With former partner Lauri Bonacorsi, he is the 2011 U.S. Junior silver medalist.

Career 
Early in his career, Mager skated with Lauren Ely. After a tryout in February 2008, he teamed up officially with Lauri Bonacorsi in late May 2008.

Bonacorsi and Mager won the 2009 U.S. novice ice dancing title. They won the bronze medal at the 2009 JGP Lake Placid. In May 2010, it was reported they had changed coaches to Natalia Linichuk and Gennadi Karponosov at the IceWorks Skating Complex in Aston, Pennsylvania.

In the 2010–11 season, Bonacorsi and Mager won the bronze medal at the 2010 JGP Brasov Cup in Romania. They won silver on the junior level at the 2011 U.S. Championships. They placed 11th at the 2011 World Junior Championships.

Bonacorsi and Mager won the silver medal at the 2011 Junior Grand Prix event in Brisbane, Australia, and bronze at another JGP event, the Walter Lombardi Trophy in Milan, Italy. They were the first alternates to the 2011 Junior Grand Prix Final in Quebec City, Canada in December 2011. Bonacorsi and Mager finished 7th at the 2012 World Junior Championships. They announced the end of their partnership in April 2012.

Personal life 
Mager completed two years at the University of Maryland and was then accepted as a transfer student at the University of Pennsylvania where he graduated summa cum laude from the college of arts and sciences with his major in Art History.

Programs 
(with Bonacorsi)

Competitive highlights

With Bonacorsi

With Ely

References

External links 

 
 Lauri Bonacorsi / Travis Mager at Icenetwork
 Lauri Bonacarsi / Travis Mager at Ice-dance.com
 2011 U.S. Championships: Lauri Bonacorsi /Travis Mager at Ice-dance.com
 Travis Mager (Twitter)
 Lauri Bonacorsi / Travis Mager JGP Milan Italy YouTube video

American male ice dancers
1990 births
Living people
People from Silver Spring, Maryland
People from Fulton, Maryland